Devil Doll is a 1964 British horror film about an evil ventriloquist, "The Great Vorelli", and his dummy Hugo, directed by Lindsay Shonteff. It stars William Sylvester and Yvonne Romain.

Plot
Hypnotist/magician "The Great Vorelli" and his dummy Hugo perform before a packed audience in London. The audience observes tension between the ventriloquist and Hugo, who Vorelli keeps in a locked cage between performances. American reporter Mark English is assigned a story on Vorelli, and solicits his girlfriend Marianne Horn, a wealthy heiress, to go with him to another show.

At the show, Vorelli asks for a volunteer. Mark encourages Marianne to go up. Vorelli hypnotizes her and makes her dance the Twist. During Vorelli's ventriloquism act, Hugo gets up from his chair and walks around, seemingly under his own power. Mark, wanting a closer look at Hugo to determine how this trick is performed, gets Marianne to invite Vorelli to her aunt's charity ball.

While Vorelli performs his ventriloquism at the ball, Hugo takes a knife from the buffet table and tries to stab Vorelli, only stopping when Vorelli focuses all his will. The guests assume this is part of Vorelli's act. Mark secretly examines Hugo, and finds he is a simple dummy, without clockwork mechanisms, a space for an operator, or any other feature that might allow him to walk on his own. The night of the ball, Vorelli stays at the mansion of Marianne's aunt, where he rapes Marianne after using his power to subdue her will. Hugo appears in Mark's room and pleads "Help me ... 1948 ... Berlin" before disappearing.

Marianne falls into a semi-coma that the doctors cannot alleviate. In one lucid moment, she tells Mark that "He keeps calling me" and "Make him stop". Mark realizes her state is the result of being hypnotized by Vorelli, and begins an investigation into Vorelli's past. Through a colleague, Mark discovers that Vorelli was a medical doctor who dabbled in Eastern magic and was disbarred. The colleague guides Mark to a former assistant of Vorelli's who lives in Berlin, named Mercedes. She tells Mark that another assistant, Hugo, worked for Vorelli in 1947, and was hypnotized into a state where he could not feel pain as part of their act. Mercedes would catch the two in strange conferences. One night, Vorelli stabbed Hugo on stage, and this time Hugo reacted with pain. Hugo was comatose for three months, during which Vorelli transferred Hugo's soul into the dummy, resulting in his death. The death was ruled an accident, and no one believed Mercedes's story, despite a theatre worker testifying he saw the dummy move immediately after Hugo screamed in pain.

Mark suspects Vorelli deliberately hypnotized Hugo to die from the knife wound, but his concerns over Vorelli are greatly assuaged when he hears that Marianne has awoken from her comatose state.

Vorelli's current assistant and lover, Magda, is outraged at his rape of Marianne and threatens to go to the police. Vorelli taunts Hugo into murdering Magda with a knife when Vorelli is visiting with stage crew elsewhere. Vorelli then hires a new, younger assistant whom he also puts under his hypnotic control.

Vorelli visits Marianne in her home and hypnotizes her into agreeing to marry him. Vorelli confides to Hugo that he plans to marry Marianne in Spain and transfer her spirit into another doll before letting her body die and inheriting her wealth. He opens Hugo's cage, intending to discipline him due to his recent rebellions. Instead, Hugo smashes the face of the doll intended for Marianne, and attacks Vorelli. The two struggle, their two souls interacting, until Vorelli finally locks Hugo back in his cage. Mark enters the room. Vorelli speaks in Hugo's voice and tells Mark that Hugo has now transferred his soul into Vorelli's body and vice versa and that Marianne's hypnotized state is broken. From Hugo's former puppet body, Vorelli begs for help from Mark, whose response is not shown.

Cast
 Bryant Haliday as The Great Vorelli
 William Sylvester as Mark English
 Yvonne Romain as Marianne Horn
 Sandra Dorne as Magda Cardenas
 Nora Nicholson as Aunt Eva
 Alan Gifford as Bob Garrett
 Karel Stepanek as Dr. Heller
 Francis De Wolff as Dr. Keisling (as Francis de Wolff)

Production
In 1951, Frederick E. Smith wrote for London Mystery Magazine the story on which the film would be based. He earned £10 for doing so, and said that one of the conditions of cashing his cheque was that he surrender any rights of resale of the story.

The film's script was originally written in 1957. In 1959, film producer Richard Gordon announced in an interview had that he obtained the film rights to the story. Funding was from Gordon Films, Galaworld and the NFFC.

Sidney J. Furie was originally scheduled to direct, but was offered a more prestigious film, so he recommended his fellow Canadian Lindsay Shonteff. Gordon later said Furie advised Shonteff throughout the making of the film. Shonteff had to re-edit it after completion, to avoid an X rating from the British Board of Film Censors. Both this version, for the UK and Canada, and the original one, shown in Europe, have been released on DVD; the Special Edition DVD contains both. The European version includes some bare breasts and a strip tease (done under hypnosis). It also bills Sylvester above Haliday, while the British version displays Haliday's name first, and in a considerably larger font than that used for his co-stars' names.

Gordon said the cost of the film was £20,000, plus $20,000 for expenses and the salaries of American personnel—including Gordon and Halliday—for an estimated total of $60,000–$75,000.

The movie was distributed in the United States by Joe Solomon. It was released on VHS by Gorgon Video in 1985.

Reception
Blockbuster Entertainment gave the film four stars. Film critic Leonard Maltin gave the film three stars in his review, summarizing it as an "[o]bscure, underrated mystery that features an eerily effective Haliday as a hypnotist-ventriloquist trying to transfer Romain's soul into that of a dummy, as he had already done with his onetime assistant. An exquisitely tailored, sharply edited sleeper." Morgan Zabroff for Famous Monsters of Filmland declared the film "[o]ne of the most brilliant films to come from England in 1964," as well as one of the most underrated films of its genre.

Variety was negative towards the film, calling it "slow paced" and asserting that its "gimmick" had been done better in 1929's The Great Gabbo and 1945's Dead of Night. Sylvester's acting was praised by the magazine, which added that Halliday's performance was dependent on his voice. Reviewing the film for Cinefantastique's 50th anniversary, Steve Biodrowski called it a rip-off of Dead of Night.

Legacy
Devil Doll was featured in an October 1997 episode of Mystery Science Theater 3000. The episode was released on DVD by Shout! Factory on 9 November 2010.

The film was also shown on the 27 February 2021 episode of Svengoolie.

See also
 Killer toys

References

Bibliography

External links
 
 
 
 

1964 films
1964 horror films
Ventriloquism
Films directed by Lindsay Shonteff
Films based on short fiction
British horror films
Puppet films
British black-and-white films
Horror films about toys
Films about haunted dolls
Films about sentient toys
Films about hypnosis
Body swapping in films
Films set in country houses
1960s English-language films
1960s British films